Liberty High School (also referred to as LHS) is a high school in Henderson in the U.S. state of Nevada. It is part of the Clark County School District. Liberty considers itself to be a "classical school." This is because through Liberty's curriculum, one can study Latin, as well as focus on the history and society of ancient Rome and Greece.

History
Before the school opened in 2003, prospective students chose the name "Liberty" and the school mascot "The Patriot" through a survey mailed to their homes. This was largely chosen due to the recent terrorist attacks. Liberty's mascot is the Patriot.

Extracurricular activities

Clubs
There are more than fifty clubs that a student can participate in at Liberty. Among them are Ace Dance Crew, Anime Club, Key Club, NHS, Culinary Club, and Black Student Union.

AFJROTC 
Liberty High school has an Air Force JROTC program. They are unit NV-20051. They started in 2005 with two instructors. They have drill teams which includes an armed drill team, an unarmed drill team, and a color guard.

Athletics
The Liberty Patriots compete in the Southern League of the Nevada 5A division.  Through most of the school's history, the athletic department used the Pat Patriot logo used by the New England Patriots from 1971–92.  Recently, the school has adopted a logo similar to that used by the athletic program at Southern New Hampshire University. Their Varsity Quiz Program is nationally ranked, having gone to the High School National Championship Tournament for three consecutive years (2017-2019). Their athletics department is lead by head football coach Rich Muraco.

 Under head coach Rich Muraco (2009-present), the boys varsity football team have an overall record of 131-34 (as of 2023) and a league record of 60-4. The varsity football team won eight straight Sunrise Region Championships from 2010–2017 and won the Desert Region Championship in 2019. They were state-runners-up in 2012, 2015, and 2016. They also were Division Champions 2010-2019. In their 2019 season, the Patriots defeated the 10x reigning Nevada state champions, and ex-national champions, Bishop Gorman, becoming the first Nevada team to beat Gorman in 10 years. This game was ranked by MaxPreps as the 9th best high school football game of all time. They went on to win their first state championship title against Centennial, with a final score of 50-7.
 The girls varsity bowling team won the school's first Nevada Interscholastic Activities Association State Championship in 2012.
 The boys varsity track and field team won the Sunrise Region Championship and took 3rd place at the State Championship in 2013. They took 3rd place at the State Championship in 2016. They took 2nd place at the State Championship in 2022.
 The girls varsity basketball team were Sunrise Region Champions and state runners-up in 2016.
 The boys varsity basketball team were state champions in 2022, defeating the 30-1 Bishop Gorman team in OT of the state championship. They were state runners-up in 2023. They are coached by Kevin Soares.
 The girls varsity flag football team went 21-4 in the 2021-22 season and won 12-7 in the state championship game over Desert Oasis.

Nevada Interscholastic Activities Association State Championships 
 Basketball (Boys) - 2022
 Flag Football (Girls) - 2022
 Football - 2019
 Baseball - 2014
 Bowling (Girls) - 2012

Band Program
Liberty's band, known as the "Sound of Liberty" during their marching season, has won many awards and competitions throughout the years that they have been competing. The Sound of Liberty Marching Band has been a finalist at the Sounds Across the Valley Nevada Championships consistently throughout their recent history. The marching band supports the school by performing at football games, basketball games, pep rallies, and school assemblies. The band is currently under the direction of Dr. Donald Malpass. The Color Guard program is under the direction of Mrs. Cristy Stephens.

The band program offers concert band and marching band classes all year round to provide a well rounded, competitive education to its students. The programs offered at Liberty High School currently are:

1. Advanced Concert Band (Wind Ensemble)

2. Intermediate Concert Band (Symphonic Band)

3. Jazz 1 and 2 (Red, White, and Blues)

4. Marching Band (Sound of Liberty)

5. Winter Colorguard (Colors of Liberty)

6. Winter Drumline (Pulse of Liberty)

The growing concert band program has become consistently stronger in recent history. The Symphonic Band made its debut CCSD Festival Performance earning a rating of Excellent, and the Wind Ensemble earned a rating of Superior for the 2014-2015 and 2022-2023 school years.

Marching Band is not a requirement at Liberty High School - however you must participate to qualify for Wind Ensemble (Advanced Band). LHS is on a 4x4 block schedule. If a student chooses to only participate in concert band, that class meets every other day all throughout the year with 5 formal concert performances on and off campus. Students participating in marching band will be in a band class every day (marching class on one day, and concert class on the other) all year round. The marching class is used as a solo and ensemble performance class, a beginners music theory class and sight reading class once marching band is finished. This will take up both elective spots for an incoming freshmen. Freshmen who are interested in taking an elective in addition to band are strongly encouraged to take PE I during summer school or online. Once marching band is completed, the members will receive a PE II credit.

Band Camp is a requirement for all students participating in marching band. Band camp starts the week after school ends, and is two weeks long. There is also drill camp two weeks before school begins.

Choral programs
Liberty offers five different choir classes and an innovative approach to music in special education. Liberty's award-winning choirs have been featured at festivals in San Diego and New York City. Liberty's founding director, Nicki Bakko Toliver, recently completed her DMA in Choral Conducting at North Dakota State University and is currently the Assistant Professor of Choral Music at Wartburg College in Waverly, Iowa.

The choir's current director is Mr. Lamont Russell, a graduate of Oklahoma City University.  Under Mr. Russell's direction, the Choir Department has grown from one choir to five choirs. The Department consists of the following choirs: Viva Voce (Mixed Chamber Choir); Voce Harmonique (Women's Chamber Choir); Men of Note!(Men's Choir); Bella Tones (Beginning/Intermediate Women's Choir); The Patriot Stars Show Choir; and features the following small groups: Patriotix Acappella Group; Mixed Jazz Quartet, and a Men's Barbershop Quartet. Recently, the LHS Choirs performed with Amira Willighagen, Winner of Holland's Got Talent. In addition to concerts and festival throughout the year, the Choir participates in Community Service Projects such as Relay for Life and presents benefit performances around the valley.

Theatre programs
Liberty Theater also known as "Liberty Patriot Players" and Troupe 6730 offers both Technical Theater I, II,III, and VI and Theater I, II, III, and VI. The Classes are taught by Mrs. Sharon Chadwick the Troupe Director of Nevada STO board. Liberty High School has put on numerous classics such as "Our Town" by Thornton Wilder. It has also put on many broadway shows such as "The 25th Annual Putnam County Spelling Bee", "Brigadoon" "Grease" Troupe 6730 has been to the Regional Short play and individual events showcase for Nevada Thespians, State Conference For Nevada Thespians and International Thespian Conference in Lincoln, Nebraska. The Patriot Players also hold an Annual Lip Sync competition, Broadway Review, Evening of Classical Theater, and Veterans Day Concert.

Feeder schools
John R. Hummel Elementary School (2003)
John C. Bass Elementary School (2001)
Roberta C. Cartwright Elementary School (1999)
Roger D. Gehring Elementary School (2002)
Shirley A. Barber Elementary School (2018)
John R. Beatty Elementary School (2000)
Steven G. Schorr Elementary School (2006)
Shirley and Bill Wallin Elementary School (2010)
Robert and Sandy Ellis Elementary School (2018)
Charles Silvestri Junior High School (1997)
Del E. Webb Middle School (2005)

References

External links 
School website

Buildings and structures in Henderson, Nevada
Clark County School District
Education in Henderson, Nevada
Educational institutions established in 2003
High schools in Clark County, Nevada
2003 establishments in Nevada
Public high schools in Nevada